Kaunda is an African surname that may refer to the following notable people:
 Betty Kaunda (1928–2012), First Lady of Zambia, wife of Kenneth 
 Billy Kaunda, Government minister of Malawi
 John Kaunda, Zambian football goalkeeper
 Kenneth Kaunda (1924–2021), first president of Zambia
Kenneth Kaunda International Airport
Dr Kenneth Kaunda District Municipality
 Mxolisi Kaunda (born 1972), South African politician
 Philemon Kaunda, Zambian football player 
 Simon Vuwa Kaunda, Malawian politician
 Tilyenji Kaunda (born 1954), Zambian politician, son of Kenneth
 Yolanda Kaunda (born 1980), Malawian aviator